Sophie's World is a 1997 educational adventure game developed by The MultiMedia Corporation and published by Voyager. It is an adaption of the novel Sophie's World by Norwegian writer Jostein Gaarder.

Development 
The game was developed by a small team of 6-7 core Mac developers and Win32 developers, one lead graphic designer, and producers, as well as contract workers. The scenes, audio, and timelines were collaborated between the departments.  Sam Deane created a game engine from scratch to present the scenes. Simon Jenkins wrote the natural language engine for the in-game instant message application. The writing was aided by academics of philosophy to ensure realism and accuracy.

Plot and gameplay 
The player explores concepts in Western philosophy through the eyes of the 14-year-old Sophie. The title contains an in-game encyclopaedic database.

Critical reception 
Ray Ivey of Just Adventure described it as short, imaginative, and delicious. Quandaryland's Steve Ramsey wrote that while the game only took an hour to complete, he didn't have a desire to stay in the world for longer.

At the 1997 Bima Awards, the British Interactive Multimedia Association presented the game with a craft award for sound and music.

References 

Educational video games
1997 video games
Classic Mac OS games
Video games based on novels
Video games developed in the United Kingdom
Windows games